The V-STOL Solution is an American ultralight aircraft that was designed by Dick Turner in 1998 and produced by V-STOL Aircraft. The aircraft was supplied as a kit for amateur construction.

Design and development
The design goal of the Solution was to produce a legal US FAR 103 Ultralight Vehicles regulations compliant single seat ultralight that could be easily converted to a two-seater with the addition of a second seat and a larger engine. It features a cable-braced high-wing, a single-seat, open cockpit, conventional landing gear and a single engine in pusher configuration.

The aircraft is made from bolted-together aluminium tubing, with the flying surfaces covered in Dacron sailcloth. The second seat would be installed behind the first, in tandem, and could be optionally equipped with dual controls.

The pilot is accommodated on an open seat and has conventional three-axis controls in the form of a centre stick and rudder pedals.

V-STOL Aircraft had the design on the market for only a short period before the company went out of business. Assembly time from the kit is estimated at 50 hours.

Specifications (Solution single-seat)

References

Solution
1990s United States ultralight aircraft
Homebuilt aircraft
Single-engined pusher aircraft